Nordhordland Ballklubb is a Norwegian football club.

It was created in 1979 as a merger of the football sections of three local clubs, Knarvik IL, Seim IL and IL Alvidra. The team is located in Knarvik about 25 minutes' drive from Bergen.

The men's part of the club plays in the 5th Division, the sixth-highest tier of football in Norway. It last played in the 3rd Division in 2010.

References

Lindås
Sport in Hordaland
Football clubs in Norway
Association football clubs established in 1979
1979 establishments in Norway